The Minister for Enterprise, Investment and Trade is a minister in the Government of New South Wales who has responsibilities for sponsoring and supporting enterprise, trade, and international investment in the state of New South Wales, Australia. The current Minister for Enterprise, Investment and Trade is Alister Henskens since 5 August 2022. The minister is responsible for administering the portfolio through the Enterprise, Investment and Trade cluster.

Ultimately the minister is responsible to the Parliament of New South Wales.

History
In 1921 in the first Dooley ministry the portfolio of Labour and Industry was split into Labour and the new portfolio of State Industrial Enterprises. State Industrial Enterprises became the responsibility of the Minister for Railways. The responsibilities included - building construction, metal quarries, monier pipeworks, docks and workshops. The portfolio was abolished in 1925 in the first Lang ministry.

List of ministers

Enterprise, investment and trade
The following individuals have served as the Minister for Enterprise, Investment and Trade, or any precedent titles:

References

Enterprise, Investment and Trade